Vlade Lazarevski (born 9 June 1983) is a former professional football defender. He represented the Macedonia national football team internationally.

Club career
On 19 December 2007 Lazarevski was thought to be in England on a trial-basis training with Premier League team Derby County; it was unsuccessful and he returned to Poland.

In late February, Lazarevski emerged in Ukraine, training with a team of Ukrainian Premier League FC Metalist Kharkiv. Soon after transfer occurred and Vlade was announced to the public as club's newest signing.  He played for Karpaty Lviv in 2009 before joining Rijeka on 27 January 2010. Lazarevski signed with Lokomotiv Astana on 8 July 2010. In December 2010 Lazarevski confirmed his move to FC Tobol. The club was not paying his salary so he reported them to FIFA and he became a free agent. The next summer, on his 28th Birthday he signed with Amiens who had just been promoted to the French Ligue 2. In February 2014 he signed with NK Zvijezda Gradačac.

In the season 2016–17 he helped FK Temnić Lipa win the Serbian League East and achieve promotion to Serbian second level, the Serbian First League.

International career
While playing in Serbia with Napredak, still as a talented youngster, he became almost simultaneously a member of the Macedonia U-21 team. He made his debut for the Macedonian senior team in a June 2005 FIFA World Cup qualification match against the Czech Republic and has earned a total of 43 caps, scoring no goals. His final international was an October 2011 European Championship qualification match against Slovakia.

References

External links
 
 Profile at MacedonianFootball 

1983 births
Living people
Sportspeople from Kruševac
Association football central defenders
Macedonian footballers
North Macedonia under-21 international footballers
North Macedonia international footballers
FK Kumanovo players
FK Napredak Kruševac players
Dyskobolia Grodzisk Wielkopolski players
FC Metalist Kharkiv players
Polonia Warsaw players
FC Karpaty Lviv players
HNK Rijeka players
FC Astana players
Amiens SC players
FK Smederevo players
Flamurtari Vlorë players
NK Zvijezda Gradačac players
FK Radnički Niš players
FK Temnić players
First League of Serbia and Montenegro players
Ekstraklasa players
Ukrainian Premier League players
Croatian Football League players
Kazakhstan Premier League players
Ligue 2 players
Serbian SuperLiga players
Kategoria Superiore players
Premier League of Bosnia and Herzegovina players
Serbian First League players
Macedonian expatriate footballers
Expatriate footballers in Poland
Macedonian expatriate sportspeople in Poland
Expatriate footballers in Ukraine
Macedonian expatriate sportspeople in Ukraine
Expatriate footballers in Croatia
Macedonian expatriate sportspeople in Croatia
Expatriate footballers in Kazakhstan
Macedonian expatriate sportspeople in Kazakhstan
Expatriate footballers in France
Macedonian expatriate sportspeople in France
Expatriate footballers in Albania
Macedonian expatriate sportspeople in Albania
Expatriate footballers in Bosnia and Herzegovina
Macedonian expatriate sportspeople in Bosnia and Herzegovina